Dalip Singh Rana (born 27 August 1972) is a retired Indian professional wrestler and wrestling promoter better known by his ring name The Great Khali.  He is best known for his tenure in WWE where he became the first Indian-born WWE World Heavyweight Champion in history. 

Dalip Singh's famous achievements in WWE made him a national hero in India. In a country where cricket is the most popular sport, he created a sensation after he won the World Heavyweight Championship in 2007 and, became one of the most famous athletes and a legend in India. WWE honoured  Khali by inducting him in WWE Hall of Fame in 2021. 

He made his professional wrestling debut in 2000. He has appeared in four Hollywood films, two Bollywood films and several television shows. He is the founder and head coach of India's largest professional wrestling promotion, Continental Wrestling Entertainment, founded in 2015. He was inducted into the WWE Hall of Fame as a member of the 2021 class.

Early life 
Rana was born in a Rajput Family to Jwala Ram and his wife Tandi Devi was also born in a Rajput family family in the Dhiraina village of Himachal Pradesh's Sirmaur district.

One of seven siblings in a poor family, Rana had to do odd jobs to help his family make ends meet. He suffers from acromegaly, which among other symptoms causes gigantism and chin protrusion. When Rana was serving as a security guard in Shimla, he caught the eye of a police officer from the neighbouring State of Punjab who  previously helped several employees of the Punjab Police to become international sportspersons, got him employed into the Punjab Police in 1993. Although Rana was reluctant to leave Himachal Pradesh, his brother was also offered a job in the Punjab Police, after his arrival in Punjab's Jalandhar, he trained in local gyms to become a wrestler and soon was selected for specialised wrestling training in the United States.

Professional wrestling career

All Pro Wrestling (2000–2001) 
Under the ring name Giant Singh he first became a professional wrestler for All Pro Wrestling (APW) in the United States, making his first appearance in October 2000 when teaming with Tony Jones against the West Side Playaz.

World Championship Wrestling (2001) 
When Rana came to San Francisco, he signed a contract with World Championship Wrestling (WCW) and spent eight months there, until WCW was bought by their rival promotion, World Wrestling Federation (WWF).

New Japan Pro-Wrestling (2001–2002) 
As Giant Singh, he received an offer from New Japan Pro-Wrestling (NJPW) by Team 2000 leader, Masahiro Chono, along with another big man, Giant Silva. They were the tallest tag team in professional wrestling history at an average height of 7 foot 1 inches and a combined weight of 805 pounds, teaming up for the first time at the Tokyo Dome in October when labelled as Club 7 by Chono defeated Hiroshi Tanahashi, Kenzo Suzuki, Wataru Inoue and Yutaka Yoshie in a handicap Match when Silva pinned Tanahashi and Inoue at the same time. Singh suffered his first loss in a tag team match at Wrestling World 2002 in January 2002 after Hiroyoshi Tenzan pinned him with a cradle. Singh suffered another big tag defeat during March, being pinned by Manabu Nakanishi after a German suplex pin, though his most critical loss came in August at Tokyo Nippon Budokan, when after a falling out he was pinned by Silva in a singles match.

Various promotions (2002–2006) 
Starting in 2002, he also wrestled in the Mexican promotion Consejo Mundial de Lucha Libre (CMLL) and the Japanese promotion All Japan Pro Wrestling (AJPW) until 2006, when he signed with WWE.

World Wrestling Entertainment/WWE

Undefeated streak (2006–2007) 
On 2 January 2006, Rana became the first Indian professional wrestler to be signed to a contract by World Wrestling Entertainment (WWE). He was assigned to their developmental federation, Deep South Wrestling, where he wrestled under his real name.

With Daivari as his manager, the unnamed Singh debuted on WWE television as a villain on 7 April episode of SmackDown!, attacking The Undertaker and leaving him defenseless during his match with Mark Henry, thus causing a no contest ruling. The following week on SmackDown! he was introduced as The Great Khali and Daivari explained that he finally had a client who would destroy The Undertaker (after Muhammad Hassan and Mark Henry had previously failed). Khali made his in-ring debut on 21 April episode of SmackDown!, defeating Funaki.

On 12 May episode of SmackDown!, Khali was John Bradshaw Layfield's hand-picked opponent against World Heavyweight Champion Rey Mysterio (Khali had a height advantage of 21 inches and weight advantage of 250 pounds) and defeated Mysterio in a squash match. In his match against The Undertaker at Judgment Day on 21 May, Khali defeated The Undertaker with a kick to the head after receiving some illegal help from Daivari. Khali continued on a rampage for several weeks, winning handicap matches, beating wrestlers up in a display of power and mocking The Undertaker's signature pin and victory pose.

Khali then challenged The Undertaker to a Punjabi Prison match at The Great American Bash. However, Khali was not medically cleared to compete in the match and was replaced by Big Show, who lost despite Khali's interference. After he was medically cleared, Khali was challenged by The Undertaker to a Last Man Standing match at SummerSlam on 20 August. The match was moved to the SmackDown! just prior to SummerSlam and was won by The Undertaker, giving Khali his first definite loss in WWE.

The Great Khali and Daivari were moved to the ECW brand officially when they made their ECW debuts on 31 October episode of ECW on Sci Fi, when Daivari defeated "The Reject" Shannon Moore in a very quick match. Afterwards, Moore was manhandled by Khali. Daivari continued his ECW winning streak over the next several weeks with The Great Khali usually following up the contest with a chokebomb on Daivari's opponent. At December to Dismember on 3 December, Daivari got a victory over Tommy Dreamer following a roll-up. Dreamer then chased Daivari backstage, but Khali appeared and caught Dreamer, planting him on the steel ramp with a chokebomb.

On 8 January 2007 episode of Raw, Jonathan Coachman announced that Khali had signed with Raw (without Daivari, who stayed on ECW) and would wrestle John Cena in the main event, which Khali won by disqualification after Cena took a steel chair held by Armando Estrada and hit Khali with it, though after the match he performed a chokeslam on Cena and left the ringside area, leaving Cena prone to an attack by Umaga. On 19 February episode of Raw, Khali demanded better competition after easily defeating The Highlanders. Four days later on SmackDown!, Khali interfered in a Falls Count Anywhere Money in the Bank qualifying match between Kane and King Booker by costing Kane the match, leading to a feud culminating in a match at WrestleMania 23, which Khali won in his first appearance at WrestleMania after slamming Kane with the Khali Bomb and choking him with a hook and chain at the end of the match. On 30 April episode of Raw, Khali attacked Edge, Randy Orton and Shawn Michaels (all three top contenders to the WWE Championship at the time) backstage. Khali then attacked WWE Champion John Cena as well, sending a message that he wanted Cena's title. The next week on Raw, Khali defeated Michaels in a number-one contender's match for the WWE Championship at Judgment Day. At Judgment Day on 20 May, Khali lost via submission for the first time when tapping out to Cena's STFU, though Khali's foot was under the rope and unnoticed by the referee. The next night on Raw, Khali expressed outrage over the outcome via his new translator and manager, Ranjin Singh. At One Night Stand on 3 June, Khali lost to Cena in a Falls Count Anywhere match after he was hit with an FU off a crane bed, thus marking the first time Khali had been pinned in a singles match.

World Heavyweight Champion (2007–2008) 
On 11 June episode of Raw, as part of the 2007 WWE draft, Khali was drafted to the SmackDown! brand as the brand's first draft pick. In July, Khali began a feud with Batista and the two were scheduled for a match at The Great American Bash. However, because Edge vacated the World Heavyweight Championship due to a legitimate injury, a 20-man battle royal was held for the title on 20 July edition of SmackDown!, which Khali won after eliminating both Kane and Batista in one move, winning his first World Heavyweight Championship. Khali dominated and defeated both Batista and Kane in a triple-threat match at The Great American Bash on 22 July. Khali debuted a new finisher called the Khali Vise Grip (a two-handed clawhold) which he used to wear down Batista, Kane, and Ric Flair.

At SummerSlam on 26 August, Khali lost by disqualification when he used a steel chair, but retained the title. Khali then began a feud with Rey Mysterio after Mysterio won a Championship Competition to become the number-one contender, leading Khali to apply his Visa Grip on Mysterio on 7 September episode of SmackDown! until Batista came to the rescue, with SmackDown General Manager Theodore Long informing Khali that he would have to defend the World Heavyweight Championship also against Batista in a triple threat match at Unforgiven on 16 September, where Khali's 61-day reign ended after receiving a spinebuster. Khali challenged Batista to a rematch in a Punjabi Prison match at No Mercy on 7 October, which Khali lost by failing to escape the Punjabi Prison before Batista.

In late 2007 and early 2008, Khali was put in a program with Finlay usually trying to assault Hornswoggle, but with Finlay stopping him. Khali participated in the SmackDown Elimination Chamber match at No Way Out on 17 February, which was won by The Undertaker. At WrestleMania XXIV on 30 March, Khali participated in a 24-man battle royal to determine a challenger for ECW Champion Chavo Guerrero that evening, but the match was won by Kane. Khali then had a short feud with Big Show, culminating in a match at Backlash on 27 April, which Big Show won.

In July, Khali feuded with Triple H over the WWE Championship and on 25 July episode of SmackDown he won a battle royal also involving Big Show, Jeff Hardy, Montel Vontavious Porter, Mr. Kennedy, and Umaga for the right to face Triple H at SummerSlam. At SummerSlam on 17 August, Khali lost to Triple H after receiving a Pedigree. Khali was given another opportunity to win the WWE Championship when he faced Jeff Hardy to gain entry into the championship scramble at Unforgiven on 7 September, but Triple H interfered in the qualification match and aided Hardy with a chair shot to Khali, helping Hardy win and eliminating Khali from title contention.

Punjabi Playboy (2008–2011) 

On 3 October, daredevil Johnny Knoxville aired an interview with Khali and his translator on his website, jackassworld.com, but when Knoxville asked about Khali's "taliwacker" he became upset and threatened to tip the interview table onto Knoxville. Khali later invited Knoxville to attend 13 October episode of Raw, where Knoxville was attacked by Khali, WWE Diva Beth Phoenix and Hornswoggle. Khali then took on a more fun persona and became a fan favourite when he and Ranjin Singh hosted the weekly Khali Kiss Cam, where Singh would summon ostensibly random women from the audience to kiss Khali. In May 2009, The Great Khali feuded with Dolph Ziggler, winning by disqualification after Ziggler attacked him with a steel chair. As a result, Khali began coming out to the ring during and after Ziggler's matches, in attempt to gain revenge and to stop Ziggler from cheating. Over the next few weeks, Khali lost to Ziggler by countout and disqualification after Ziggler made it look like Khali hit him with a steel chair. At The Bash on 28 June, Khali lost to Ziggler by pinfall after Kane returned and attacked Khali. It was later revealed that Ranjin Singh was Khali's brother, while the feud with Kane resulted in matches at SummerSlam on 23 August and Breaking Point on 13 September, both of which Khali lost.

Khali required knee surgery and Kane assaulted him with the ring steps during a match so Khali could have time off. Whilst injured, Khali made a surprise appearance alongside Ranjin Singh, Ozzy Osbourne and his wife Sharon on 2 November episode of Raw as a judge for the Raw's Got Talent segment, in which he hit Chavo Guerrero with a chop. Khali made his official return on 14 December episode of Raw, teaming with Christian and Kane to defeat Ezekiel Jackson, Vladimir Kozlov and William Regal.

On 2 April episode of SmackDown it was announced that Khali would take time off to spend time with his family and regroup his thoughts back in India, but he made an appearance as Khaluber (Khali dressed as MacGruber) on 19 April Raw by teaming up with special guest host Will Forte (as MacGruber) in a handicap match against Vladimir Kozlov which they won by intentional countout. As part of the 2010 WWE supplemental draft, Khali and Ranjin Singh were both drafted back to the Raw brand. After returning from his hiatus the previous month, Khali was announced by John Cena to be a part of his team along with Bret Hart, Chris Jericho, Edge, John Morrison and R-Truth to face The Nexus at SummerSlam on 15 August, but on 9 August episode of Raw he was assaulted and injured by The Nexus, thus removing him from the match. Following the attack, Khali took another hiatus to compete in Big Boss, in which he was the runner up on.

Khali made his return at the 2011 Royal Rumble, but was eliminated shortly by Mason Ryan. On 14 March episode of Raw, after Khali defeated The Miz by disqualification, Miz assaulted Khali with a steel chair, injuring him. Khali won an interbrand dark match battle royal at WrestleMania XXVII on 3 April. On 26 April, Khali was drafted back to SmackDown as part of the 2011 supplemental draft. Khali returned on 29 April episode of SmackDown, talking backstage with Jinder Mahal, who made his WWE debut that night. On 2 May episode of Raw, Khali dressed up as the Tooth Fairy at The Rock's birthday party. On 6 May episode of SmackDown, Mahal—unimpressed by how Khali and Ranjin Singh have been partaking in childish activities instead of winning matches—confronted Singh about his mismanagement of Khali. Mahal then interrupted a Khali Kiss Cam segment the following week on SmackDown, slapping Khali twice. On 20 May episode of SmackDown, Mahal interrupted Khali's match against Jey Uso, which led to Khali leaving the ring to confront Mahal, who then slapped Khali again, which made Khali re-enter the ring, defeat Jey Uso and then assault Jimmy Uso after the match.

On 27 May episode of SmackDown, after being defeated by Kane, Mahal came out and shoved Ranjin Singh and then Khali used his Vise Grip on Singh, thus forming an alliance with Mahal and acting as Mahal's bodyguard, assaulting Mahal's opponents after his matches. On 1 July edition of SmackDown, Ranjin Singh revealed that Mahal was their brother-in-law and that if Khali did not obey Mahal, then he would divorce Khali's sister and put his family back into poverty. On 9 September episode of SmackDown, Khali and Mahal went against WWE Tag Team Champions Air Boom (Evan Bourne and Kofi Kingston) in a losing effort after Khali pushed Mahal, allowing Kingston to hit his finishing move onto Mahal and after the match he walked away from Mahal, thus ending their alliance. On 23 September episode of SmackDown, Khali defeated Mahal. On 30 September episode of SmackDown, Khali was defeated by World Heavyweight Champion Mark Henry, who after the match "fractured" Khali's fibula with a steel chair.

Various alliances and final feuds (2012–2014) 

On 29 January 2012, Khali returned to WWE at the Royal Rumble as the number 15 entrant in the Royal Rumble match, eliminating Ezekiel Jackson and Jinder Mahal before being eliminated by Cody Rhodes and Dolph Ziggler. Khali returned on 3 February episode of SmackDown, saving Justin Gabriel from Rhodes, Hunico and Hunico's bodyguard Camacho, then being announced as the replacement to Mark Henry in the Elimination Chamber match for the World Heavyweight Championship at the Elimination Chamber pay-per-view event. At Elimination Chamber on 19 February, Khali failed to capture the World Heavyweight Championship after being eliminated first by Big Show. On 23 March episode of SmackDown, Khali was added to Theodore Long's WrestleMania XXVIII team, but they were defeated by John Laurinaitis' team on 1 April. In July it was announced that Khali was undergoing surgery for a benign tumor found in his pituitary gland due to acromegaly. Khali returned at the SmackDown tapings on 16 October in a match taped for Saturday Morning Slam.

On 26 December episode of Main Event, Khali won a 20-man battle royal to become the number one contender to the United States Championship. Khali received his title shot on 2 January 2013 episode of Main Event, but was defeated by defending champion Antonio Cesaro. On 27 January, Khali competed in the 2013 Royal Rumble match, but was eliminated by Daniel Bryan and Kane. In late 2013, Khali began teaming with Santino Marella and resumed being managed by Hornswoggle after they defeated Heath Slater and Jinder Mahal on 27 September episode of SmackDown, but at Battleground on 6 October they were defeated by Cesaro and Jack Swagger. On 26 January 2014, Khali participated in the 2014 Royal Rumble match, but was eliminated by The Shield.

At WrestleMania XXX on 6 April, Khali competed in the André the Giant Memorial Battle Royal, but failed to win. Khali participated in the Intercontinental Championship battle royal at Battleground on 20 July, but the match was won by The Miz. On 31 October edition of SmackDown, Khali was defeated by Rusev in what would be his final match in WWE until 2017. On 13 November, his contract expired and he left WWE.

Sporadic appearances (2017–2021) 
On 23 July 2017, Khali returned to WWE at Battleground as a Heel to assist WWE Champion Jinder Mahal in a Punjabi Prison match for the WWE Championship. He helped Mahal by preventing Randy Orton from escaping from the cage, thus Mahal escaped first and retained the title.

Khali returned on 27 April 2018 at The Greatest Royal Rumble match, entering at number 45, and lasted for less than a minute, before being eliminated by Braun Strowman and Bobby Lashley. This was his final match for WWE so far.

He was indicted into prestigious WWE Hall of Fame in 2021.

Continental Wrestling Entertainment (2015–present) 
In February 2015, Khali opened his own wrestling promotion and school in Jalandhar, Punjab, the Continental Wrestling Entertainment (CWE), which held its first event on 12 December 2015. In February 2016, he won the CWE World Heavyweight Championship.  His students such as Dilsher Shanky and Kavita Devi signed with WWE. As of 25 October 2022, Shanky is part of the main roster, while Kavita's contract ended. Both of them wrestled in Khali's promotion and won the CWE championship.

CWE is the largest professional wrestling promotion in India, with over 4.38 million YouTube subscribers and 1.31 billion video views.

Death of Brian Ong 
On 28 May 2001, Brian Ong died after receiving a flapjack wrestling move from Singh. Ong had suffered a previous concussion during the session, but the trainers gave him a lower evaluation for not avoiding injuries and told him to continue training. In addition, it was proven that Ong did not receive protective gear or supervision by All Pro Wrestling (APW) staff and this second concussion ultimately proved fatal for him. As Singh inadvertently caused his death, Ong's family brought a lawsuit against APW. APW was found liable for recklessness after less than a day of deliberations, awarding the Ong family for damages of over $1.3 million.

Television and films 

From October 2010 until the final in January 2011, Khali appeared on the television reality show Bigg Boss, on which he finished as first runner-up. The show made special arrangements only for Khali, including a custom-made bed to fit him. In March 2011, Khali had a brief cameo in episode 18 of NBC's Outsourced, and appeared on the Disney Channel TV program Pair of Kings as Atog, a rock-smashing giant, in the episode "Fight School".

Personal life 
Rana has been described as "extremely religious". He meditates every day and "abhors" alcohol and tobacco. He was a disciple of Indian spiritual guru Ashutosh Maharaj.

It is said that Rana suggested the ring name The Great Khali after the Hindu goddess Kali, who is associated with eternal energy. However he himself rejected the fact and said that the name was given to him randomly by WWE in an interview given to India TV for their show Aap Ki Adalat.

Rana's training schedule consists of two hours of weight training, morning and evening, every day, but his diet is unclear, as in some interviews it was claimed he maintains his size on a vegetarian diet and in other interviews it was claimed he consumes vast quantities of chicken. He has since clarified that he loves vegetarian food, but also consumes meat.

On 26 July 2012 it was reported that Rana underwent a brain surgery due to a tumor on his pituitary gland.

Rana became a naturalised U.S. citizen on 20 February 2014.

He joined the Bharatiya Janata Party on 10 February 2022.

Filmography

Film

Television

Championships and accomplishments 

 Continental Wrestling Entertainment
 CWE Heavyweight Championship (2 times)
 New Japan Pro-Wrestling
 Teisen Hall Six-Man Tournament (2002) – with Masahiro Chono and Giant Silva
 Pro Wrestling Illustrated
 Ranked No. 83 of the top 500 singles wrestlers in the PWI 500 in 2008
 Wrestling Observer Newsletter
 Most Overrated (2007)
 Worst Gimmick (2008)
 World Wrestling Entertainment / WWE
 World Heavyweight Championship (1 time)
 WWE Hall of Fame (Class of 2021)
 7-man Royal Rumble (2007)
 Slammy Award (1 time)
 "Damn!" Moment of the Year (2008)

Notes

Bibliography

See also  

 Sport in India – Overview of sports in India 
 Professional wrestling in India – Overview of professional wrestling in India
 WWE in India 
 Wrestling in India 
 Martial arts in India – Overview of Indian martial arts 
 List of articles about professional wrestling of India 
 List of Indian professional wrestlers

References

External links 

 
 
 
 

1972 births
 Indian professional wrestlers
21st-century professional wrestlers
American male professional wrestlers
Indian male professional wrestlers
21st-century Indian male actors
Professional wrestlers from Punjab, India
Sportspeople from Himachal Pradesh
Male actors from Himachal Pradesh
People from Sirmaur district
Indian emigrants to the United States
Naturalized citizens of the United States
American Hindus
Indian Hindus
Wrestlers with acromegaly
Living people
World Heavyweight Champions (WWE)
WWE Hall of Fame inductees